Jesse may refer to:

People and fictional characters 
 Jesse (biblical figure), father of David in the Bible.
 Jesse (given name), including a list of people and fictional characters
 Jesse (surname), a list of people

Music 
 Jesse (album), a 2003 album by Jesse Powell
 "Jesse", a 1973 song by Roberta Flack - see Roberta Flack discography
 "Jesse", a song from the album Valotte by Julian Lennon
 "Jesse", a song from the album The People Tree by Mother Earth 
 "Jesse" (Carly Simon song), a 1980 song
 "Jesse", a song from the album The Drift by Scott Walker
 "Jesse", a song from the album If I Were Your Woman by Stephanie Mills

Other
 Jesse (film), a 1988 American television film
 Jesse (TV series), a sitcom starring Christina Applegate
 Jesse (novel), a 1994 novel by Gary Soto
 Jesse (picture book), a 1988 children's book by Tim Winton
 Jesse, West Virginia, an unincorporated community
 Jesse Hall, University of Missouri, named in honor of Richard Henry Jesse

See also 
 Jess (disambiguation)
 Jessi (disambiguation)
 Jessie (disambiguation)
 Jessy (disambiguation)